David Clunie (born 16 March 1948 in Edinburgh) is a Scottish former professional footballer who played for Hearts, Berwick Rangers and St Johnstone.

Clunie scored eight goals for Hearts, mainly from penalty kicks. He was bought from Salveson Boys Club on 1 December 1964 and ended his stint with Hearts on 1 May 1977. After a year with St Johnstone, he retired.

Clunie represented the Scottish League once, in 1969. He also played twice for the Scotland under-23 team.

References

External links 

1948 births
Living people
Scottish footballers
Footballers from Edinburgh
Association football fullbacks
Heart of Midlothian F.C. players
Berwick Rangers F.C. players
St Johnstone F.C. players
Scottish Football League players
Scottish Football League representative players
Scotland under-23 international footballers